The European Union (Approval of Treaty Amendment Decision) Act 2012 (c. 15) was an Act of the Parliament of the United Kingdom which under section 3 of the European Union Act 2011 approved the European Council decision of 25 March 2011 amending Article 136 of the Treaty on the Functioning of the European Union with regard to a stability mechanism for Member States whose currency is the euro. It was passed by Parliament on 10 October 2012 and received royal assent on 31 October 2012.

The Act was repealed by the European Union (Withdrawal) Act 2018.

See also
European Council
European Stability Mechanism
 List of Acts of the Parliament of the United Kingdom relating to the European Communities / European Union

References

United Kingdom Acts of Parliament 2012
Acts of the Parliament of the United Kingdom relating to the European Union
Repealed United Kingdom Acts of Parliament